Petr Vakoč (born 11 July 1992) is a Czech cyclist, who rides for UCI Mountain Bike team Canyon Northwave.

Career

2013
In June, he won the Okolo Slovenska stage race at the age of 20. Vakoč's success continued when he won overall in the Vuelta a la Comunidad de Madrid sub-23, the under 23 version of the Vuelta a la Comunidad de Madrid. In August Vakoč won the 1.2 event Grand Prix Královéhradeckého kraje, five seconds ahead of Josef Hosek.

2014
He finished 10th overall and won a stage of the Tour de Pologne, a UCI World Tour event. He also placed second in both his nation's road race and time trial championship.

2015
In 2015, Vakoč won the National Road Race Championships 11 seconds ahead of Leopold König. In May, he rode in his first Grand Tour, the Giro d'Italia. Vakoč finished the race in 116th place overall. Vakoč earned yet another victory when he won the Czech Cycling Tour, one of his nation's biggest cycling races. He also won a stage of the Tour of Britain. He competed for his nation at the European Games, earning a bronze medal in the road race.

2016
Vakoč celebrated success in one day races during his fourth professional season, winning three major races; he won the Classic Sud-Ardèche and La Drôme Classic over successive days in February. In April, he booked his biggest victory yet at the Brabantse Pijl, a 1.HC race in Belgium. However, that would turn out to be his final professional win. He was named in the start list for the 2016 Tour de France.

Injury and recovery
In January 2018, Vakoč and team-mate Laurens De Plus suffered injuries whilst at a training camp in South Africa when they were hit by a truck: Vakoč sustained several broken vertebrae, which led to him undergoing spinal surgery and having to learn to walk again. After spending 2018 recovering, he made his return to competition at the 2019 Vuelta a San Juan.

Alpecin–Fenix
Vakoč joined  for the 2020 season. He rode for the team in the 2021 Tour de France. In October 2021 he announced that he would retire from competition at the age of 29 after the Giro del Veneto that month. The following February, Vakoč was announced to be a rider for UCI Mountain Bike Team Canyon Northwave, competing in marathon mountain bike races.

Major results

Mountain Bike

2022
 UCI MTB Marathon Series
2nd Jelenia Góra

Road

2010
 2nd Overall Tour du Pays de Vaud
1st Stage 3
 3rd Road race, National Junior Road Championships
 3rd Overall Course de la Paix Juniors
 5th Brno–Velká Bíteš–Brno
2011
 1st  Time trial, National Under-23 Road Championships
2013
 1st  Overall Okolo Slovenska
1st  Young rider classification
 1st  Overall Vuelta a la Comunidad de Madrid Sub-23
1st  Points classification
1st Stage 1
 1st Grand Prix Královéhradeckého kraje
 2nd  Road race, UEC European Under-23 Road Championships
 2nd Memorial Van Coningsloo
 3rd Time trial, National Under-23 Road Championships
 4th Overall Czech Cycling Tour
1st  Points classification
1st Stage 4
 4th Memorial Jana Veselého
2014
 World University Championships
1st  Road race
1st  Time trial
 National Road Championships
2nd Road race
2nd Time trial
 5th Trofeo Serra de Tramuntana
 10th Overall Tour de Pologne
1st Stage 2
2015
 National Road Championships
1st  Road race
3rd Time trial
 1st  Overall Czech Cycling Tour
1st Stage 1 (TTT)
 1st Stage 2 Tour of Britain
 3rd  Road race, European Games
 7th Overall Tour du Poitou-Charentes
1st  Young rider classification
2016
 1st Brabantse Pijl
 1st Classic Sud-Ardèche
 1st La Drôme Classic
 2nd Overall Tour La Provence
1st  Young rider classification
 2nd Grand Prix de Wallonie
 National Road Championships
3rd Time trial
4th Road race
 5th Road race, UEC European Road Championships
 5th Overall Tour du Haut Var
1st  Young rider classification
 5th Strade Bianche
 9th Grand Prix Cycliste de Québec
2017
 National Road Championships
2nd Time trial
3rd Road race
 2nd Brabantse Pijl
 6th Cadel Evans Great Ocean Road Race
 7th Grand Prix Cycliste de Québec
 8th Binche–Chimay–Binche
 10th Overall BinckBank Tour
2019
 National Road Championships
3rd Road race
3rd Time trial
2020
 3rd Road race, National Road Championships
 6th Paris–Tours
 9th Overall Czech Cycling Tour
 9th Overall Tour de Luxembourg
2021
 10th La Drôme Classic

Grand Tour general classification results timeline

Classics results timeline

References

External links

1992 births
Living people
Czech male cyclists
European Games medalists in cycling
European Games bronze medalists for the Czech Republic
Cyclists at the 2016 Summer Olympics
Olympic cyclists of the Czech Republic
Cyclists at the 2015 European Games
Sportspeople from Prague